Chinook Middle School can mean one of four schools in the US state of Washington:

 Chinook Middle School in Bellevue, Washington, part of the Bellevue School District
 Chinook Middle School in Burien, Washington, part of the Highline School District
 Chinook Middle School in Kennewick, Washington, part of the Kennewick School District
 Chinook Middle School in Lacey, Washington, part of the North Thurston School District